Interstate 69 (I-69) currently has two discontinuous segments of freeway in the US state of Indiana. The original  highway, completed in November 1971, runs northeasterly from the state capital of Indianapolis, to the city of Fort Wayne, and then proceeds north to the state of Michigan (reaching its capital city, Lansing and beyond). This original segment is also known as segment of independent utility 1 (SIU 1) in the national plan for expansion of I-69.

At present, the  segment in Southwestern Indiana temporarily begins at the interchange with U.S. Highway 41 (US 41) and Veterans Memorial Parkway in Evansville and, temporarily ends at the State Road 144 (SR 144) interchange in Bargersville, concurrent with SR 37. Between I-64 and Bloomington, four new terrain sections have opened in phases in 2009, 2012, and 2015 as part of the planned national extension of I-69 southwest from Indianapolis, Indiana, via Paducah, Kentucky; Memphis, Tennessee; Shreveport, Louisiana; and Houston, Texas, to the international border with Mexico in Texas. The portion of I-69 between US 41 and I-64 is also known as the Robert D. Orr Highway and originally was designated I-164. This newer, southern segment is divided into SIUs 3 and 4, with SIU 2 being the existing segment of I-465 on which I-69 will eventually run concurrently around Indianapolis.

Route description
The southern, newer segment of I-69 begins at an interchange with US 41 on the southern edge of Evansville, briefly heading east then gradually curving to the north, around the southern and eastern city limits. Between Evansville and Bloomington, I-69 traverses the largely rural, open areas of Southwestern Indiana. Along the way, I-69 has interchanges with I-64 near the town of Elberfeld, US 50 and US 150 on the eastern side of the city of Washington, and US 231 near the town of Crane. Near the town of Elnora, I-69 transitions from generally flat terrain to much more hilly terrain. Just southwest of Bloomington, I-69 has an interchange with SR 37. From then on, both highways begin running concurrently with each other. The highways continue their journey northeastward, running around the western city limits of Bloomington and northeast to the city of Martinsville, where the highways run along the south and eastern sides of the city. Continuing northeast, the highways gradually return to more flat terrain before I-69 currently temporarily terminates at an interchange with SR 144 in the town of Bargersville, with SR 37 continuing northeast towards Indianapolis.

The northern, older segment of I-69 in Indiana begins with an interchange at the northeast corner of I-465, Indianapolis's outer beltway, where Binford Boulevard, a four-lane divided surface arterial that formerly carried SR 37, transitions into the I-69 freeway. Southbound at this junction, most I-69 motorists take exit 200, which was formerly known as exit 0, to remain on a freeway and reach either I-465 south (with SR 37 south and the likely routing of future extended I-69) or I-465 west. Running in a northeasterly direction and concurrent with SR 37, I-69 turns east-northeast at the end of that overlap just past milemarker 205 (formerly marker 5) in Fishers. From there, the freeway turns more easterly through the Campus Parkway/Southeastern Parkway (former Greenfield Avenue and SR 238) interchange and remains on that general heading until it reaches the Pendleton area.

After bypassing Pendleton to the west and north, SR 9 and SR 67 join I-69, which continues to the east-northeast into the Anderson area. There, SR 9 departs, and, shortly thereafter, I-69 begins two long curves to the northeast, and then the north. Between Daleville and Chesterfield, SR 67 departs I-69, bound for Muncie. From the Anderson–Muncie region, I-69 continues north, running concurrently with US 35 between SR 28 east of Alexandria and SR 22 near Gas City. After passing SR 18 east of Marion, I-69 then heads more northeast, straight toward the Fort Wayne metropolitan area.

At the south junction of I-469, located at Lafayette Center Road near General Motors Fort Wayne Assembly, US 33 joins I-69. US 24 used to be cosigned with I-69 from this point to the interchange at Jefferson Boulevard (originally known as Upper Huntington Road), even though it took travelers on that route several miles out of their way. However, in the mid-2010s, the Indiana Department of Transportation (INDOT) rerouted and resigned US 24 from its junction with I-469 in New Haven to use the northern leg of that beltway (concurrent with westbound US 30) to I-69, then south on the parent Interstate route to the aforementioned Jefferson Boulevard interchange. Now, eastbound US 24 joins northbound I-69 and US 33 there. US 33 continues north to the Goshen Road interchange near Coliseum Boulevard on the northwest side of Fort Wayne, where it departs I-69, eastbound US 30 joins, and the freeway curves more to the east once again. The next junction is the US 27/SR 3 interchange at Lima Road on the north side of Fort Wayne. From the mid-1960s to 2001, US 27 was rerouted onto a concurrency with I-69 from here north to the Michigan border, but the route was thereafter truncated to this point as its national northern terminus. Past the next interchange at Coldwater Road, which was the original routing of US 27 north of town, the I-69 freeway curves back to a northerly heading. At the north junction of I-469, both US 30 and the present routing of US 24 now depart to the east along that beltway, and shortly thereafter, I-69 leaves the Fort Wayne metro area.

I-69 then continues north, passing just to the west of Auburn, Waterloo, and Angola, before reaching I-80/I-90 (Indiana Toll Road) near Fremont. Very shortly thereafter, the route crosses into the state of Michigan at a point just northwest of Fremont.

The portion of I-69 between Indianapolis and the Toll Road was first proposed in the seminal report Interregional Highways, released in January 1944. By March 1946, it was formally made part of the new National System of Interstate Highways by the US Public Roads Administration. In 1958, its first extension was approved. This took the route into Michigan in order to connect with I-94 near Marshall. It was extended yet again, north to Lansing in the 1960s, and then east—first to Flint and finally to the border with Canada at Port Huron, Michigan—in the 1980s. The extreme southern portion of I-69 from I-465 to central Indianapolis was never built, though unpaved ghost ramps and overpasses for its connection to I-65 and I-70 can still be seen at the North Split/Spaghetti Bowl interchange just northeast of Downtown Indianapolis.

Configuration
Previously, all of I-69 in Indiana north of the Indianapolis metropolitan area was four lanes, but INDOT has reconstructed and widened I-69 to six lanes through most of the Fort Wayne metropolitan area by adding a travel lane in the median for each direction.

Likewise, INDOT has widened I-69 from I-465 on the northeast side of Indianapolis to SR 37/116th Street in Fishers from the original six to eight through lanes, with additional auxiliary lanes between interchanges. A project to add a third travel lane in the median for each direction between SR 37/116th Street and SR 38 near Pendleton, as well as to completely rebuild the Campus Parkway/Southeastern Parkway junction (exit 210) as a diverging diamond interchange (DDI) without necessitating its closure to traffic, began in 2016 and was completed in early 2018. As part of the Next Level Roads initiative, INDOT began a project in mid-2018 to extend the six-lane section north from Pendleton to SR 9 in Anderson and to rehab the existing four lanes of pavement from there to the junction of SR 67 and SR 32 near Daleville.

Services
Originally, there were seven rest areas and two weigh stations located along the original length of I-69 in Indiana. Of those, only four rest areas and one weigh station remain open at present. The Pipe Creek Rest Areas serve northbound and southbound travelers in Delaware County near mile marker 250 (formerly marker 50). Totally rebuilt in 2008, these areas also serve motorists on US 35, which is concurrent with I-69 along this stretch of freeway. Near milemarker 280 (formerly marker 80) in Huntington County, there were originally twin weigh stations for commercial vehicles; however, only the southbound facility is still used. Also in Huntington County, the northbound Flat Creek Rest Area once served those heading north near original milemarker 89 (now marker 289) but joined its southbound companion (which had closed in January 2009 and was located a couple miles to the north in Wells County, just south of the Wells–Allen county line near original milemarker 92) on the list of permanently closed rest stops by late 2012. These areas were closed due to their age, cost of maintenance and operation, as well as their relative proximity to the Fort Wayne metropolitan area. Two other rest areas just north of that city in DeKalb County were also closed by 2001 for similar reasons. There, the twin Cedar Creek Rest Areas once served northbound and southbound traffic near original milemarker 123 (now marker 323). In July 2011, it was reported that INDOT had begun building a new northbound facility at that location. In November 2012, it replaced the aforementioned Flat Creek northbound rest area farther to the south, which closed upon completion of this new facility at the Cedar Creek site. Finally, between Fort Wayne and the Michigan state line, the Pigeon Creek Welcome Center serves southbound motorists in Steuben County near milemarker 345 (formerly marker 145).

At present, there are no rest stops or weigh stations on the southern segment.

History

Pre-construction (1940s–1950s)
In the 1944 study titled Interregional Highways and again, in 1947 when the original Interstate routes were first officially designated, I-69 had its northern terminus listed as the Indiana Toll Road. But, in 1956, highway officials of the state of Michigan approached their Indiana counterparts about extending I-69 north from the Toll Road and into their state along the route of US 27 to reach the proposed I-94 near Marshall. After some further studies, both states requested this change and the Bureau of Public Roads (BPR) approved their proposal on January 21, 1958, making the Michigan state line the new northern terminus of I-69 in Indiana and moving its national terminus permanently into the Wolverine State.

The original southern termination point of I-69 was to have been located at the northeast corner of the inner loop (now known locally as the I-65/I-70 "North Split" interchange) near 13th Street and College Avenue in Indianapolis. Preliminary routing of the highway from SR 38 near Pendleton to Indianapolis had it generally following the SR 67 corridor southwest, joining I-70 near German Church Road on the east side of Marion County, where the two routes would then be cosigned into the city. Later route location studies in 1961 recommended a different path, heading generally west from Pendleton to SR 37 near Fishers, then southwest past the Indianapolis outer beltway concurrent with the new location of that state route (now known as Binford Boulevard). Once well into the city, it would turn south to cross Fall Creek and meet up with the inner loop at its northeast corner. In fact, the grading and overpasses for this never-built connection's ramps can still be seen at that location.

However, in 1962, the BPR ruled that it would only approve funding for I-69 to be built to the first Interstate Highway connection in the Indianapolis area, which was the I-465 outer beltway near Castleton. But, after a political fight over the inner-city portions of I-70 and I-65 (part of the national freeway revolt), it was eventually decided in the late 1970s to scrap the Northeast Freeway altogether. In its place, the state was allowed to use federal funds to widen I-70 from its original six lanes to eight and ten lanes as well as to rework its east side interchange with I-465 in order to handle the additional traffic loads from I-69 and the northeastern suburbs it serves.

Construction (1960s–1970s)
Like all Interstate Highways in Indiana, the original I-69 was constructed in segments which, when all were complete, made up the route that exists today. There were 11 segments in the federally approved original route between I-465 in the Castleton neighborhood of northeastern Indianapolis and the Michigan state line.

The first section of I-69 to be completed in Indiana was the  stretch in Allen County around the west and north sides of Fort Wayne between the former Upper Huntington Road (now Jefferson Boulevard), which then carried US 24 and SR 37, and Coldwater Road, which, at the time, was US 27 (later SR 327, but now neither). This initial portion of I-69 freeway opened to traffic on October 23, 1962. The 11th and final segment (of the original route) to be completed was the  stretch between the north leg of I-465 in Indianapolis and the split with SR 37 at Fishers, which fully opened to traffic on November 16, 1971.

Expansion on a national scale (1990s and beyond)
Long after the route's original completion, I-69 was divided into a number of SIUs dealing with a proposed extension of the freeway to the Mexican border in Texas. The original  section of I-69 in Indiana in its entirety is now part of SIU 1.

When the United States Congress enacted the Intermodal Surface and Transportation Efficiency Act in the mid-1990s, it established High Priority Corridors 18 and 20. Together, these corridors mandate the construction of an Interstate Highway from Port Huron, Michigan, to Brownsville, Texas. The new highway was designated I-69. The routing of the highway has proven to be controversial in Indiana, as it was to become a planned toll road in southern Indiana called Southern Indiana Toll Road (SITR). After nearly 10 years of studies and close coordination between the Federal Highway Administration (FHWA), the US Army Corps of Engineers (USACE), the Environmental Protection Agency (EPA), and INDOT, the final route for I-69 between Indianapolis and Evansville was announced in March 2004. At that time, it was still uncertain when the extension would be built, since no funds were available to construct the $1.8-billion highway. Nonetheless, the FHWA and INDOT have been extremely methodical in the environmental studies required for SITR to be built. State and federal highway officials opted to use a two-tier environmental study along with close coordination with USACE, the EPA, and other state and federal agencies to ensure the proposed route can withstand any legal challenge that may be brought forth by opponents. While officials have performed studies on dozens of possible alignments over the past 30 years, the most recent round of environmental studies for SITR have been ongoing since 1992.

SIU 1
SIU 1 includes the entire length of I-69 in 1998, from the I-465 interchange on the northeast side of Indianapolis north to Lansing, Michigan, then east to Port Huron, Michigan. It was built in stages between 1956 and 1992, with the final gap between Charlotte, Michigan, and Lansing completed on October 22, 1992. SIU 1 also includes the I-469 loop around the east side of Fort Wayne that opened in stages between 1989 and 1995. When the national I-69 extension project was conceived, SIU 1 was already long completed except for the northernmost portion of I-469 which was still under construction at the time, so the scope of future work in this segment of the "new I-69" would be limited.

Post-construction changes
A major project in the Fort Wayne metropolitan area began in 2002, resulting in an additional travel lane in each direction, bridge and pavement reconstruction, and interchange reconfiguration. Plans for SIU 1 also included spot changes and pavement rehabilitation to the I-469 loop around Fort Wayne and additional mainline and interchange changes to I-69 northeast of Indianapolis.

At the north end of the Fort Wayne section, a new dogbone interchange was built in 2012 at Union Chapel Road (exit 317) to serve the then-new Parkview Regional Medical Center campus, replacing an original grade separation without Interstate access at that location.

Just to the south of the Parkview complex, the junction at Dupont Road (exit 316) was rebuilt and converted into Indiana's first DDI by late October 2014.

Environmental studies and design work were subsequently undertaken, and construction on the I-69 portion of the project was initially expected to begin in 2012. However, that portion of the plan was later scaled back, with the I-69/I-465/Binford Boulevard interchange still awaiting most of the planned changes.

In the mid-2010s, the I-69 portion of the Operation Indy Commute project attempted to address many of the capacity issues the complete 2007 plan would have corrected, by adding two new travel lanes between 82nd Street and a rebuilt split with SR 37 as well as by adding auxiliary lanes between interchanges in this same area.

In December 2015, another new plan was announced to rebuild the I-69/I-465/Binford Boulevard interchange. However, construction is not scheduled to begin until 2020.

INDOT widened  of I-69 from four to six lanes between the 116th Street/SR 37 interchange at Fishers and the SR 38/State Street interchange in Pendleton, a project that began in 2016 and was completed in early 2018. This contract also included the reconstruction and conversion of the interchange at Campus Parkway/Southeastern Parkway (exit 210) into I-69's second DDI while maintaining traffic flow and full access for all directional movements. As a followup, INDOT announced in 2018 that the six-lane section would be extended by another , from Pendleton to SR 9 in Anderson. The $79-million (equivalent to $ in ) contract also includes pavement rehabilitation for another  beyond that point, to the SR 67/SR 32 interchange in Daleville.

A new interchange (exit 204) at 106th Street in Fishers, constructed between April and December 2016 (with final landscaping work extending into 2017), was opened to traffic on December 7, 2016. The original two-lane grade separation without I-69 access was replaced by two separate two-lane bridges over the freeway. Each bridge carries one direction of traffic in an oval-shaped roundabout that controls traffic on 106th Street and interchange ramps to and from both directions of I-69.

SIU 2
Since the beginning of the I-69 extension project, people have assumed that this SIU would connect I-69 SIU 1 and SIU 3 by utilizing the eastern and southern legs of the I-465 beltway in Indianapolis. In 2021, the INDOT confirmed the routing. Much of this stretch of I-465 was reconstructed during the first decade of the 2000s, with additional reconstructions scheduled for the 2010s, totally independent of the I-69 extension project. INDOT has strongly indicated that any concurrent signing of this route along I-465 will likely not be done until the southern (SIU 3, Section 6) portion of I-69 is connected (at new exit 4B, just west of the SR 37/Harding Street interchange on the southwest side of Indianapolis). That new system interchange, part of SIU 3's Section 6, is not presently scheduled to be completed and open to traffic until about 2024. The southern leg of I-465 is the last major portion of the beltway that has yet to be widened from its original six-lane cross-section, and is the scene of chronic traffic congestion. In conjunction with the construction of the I-69/I-465 southwest interchange at the northern end of SIU 3, several miles of I-465 between I-70 to the west and I-65 to the east will be reconstructed and widened to handle the additional traffic expected to be generated on I-465 when the last section of I-69 is completed. Scheduled to begin in 2021, and expected to be completed along with the I-69 interchange in 2024, the I-465 south project will involve a complete reconstruction and widening of I-465 from I-65 to I-70: the roadway will be reconstructed and widened to accommodate additional travel lanes; bridges and overpasses will be replaced; and interchanges at SR 67 and US 31 will be reconfigured.

Proposed alternatives to I-465 routing of SIU 2
On November 9, 2006, then-Governor Mitch Daniels announced plans for a  outer loop around Indianapolis to be known as the Indiana Commerce Connector (ICC). As proposed, that route would have been entirely privately funded, with a portion of the revenues possibly applied to constructing I-69 from Indianapolis to Naval Surface Warfare Center Crane Division (NSWC Crane Division). The remaining portion of the highway to Evansville, Indiana, was already funded with funds from the Major Moves initiative. Strong opposition from local residents and the then-Democratic-controlled House of Representatives forced Daniels to abandon the ICC plan on March 24, 2007, although House Democrats assured southwest Indiana residents that this decision would not affect construction on I-69 between Indianapolis and NSWC Crane Division.

, there was no timeline for funding or construction of any new-terrain sections for SIU 2. If built, the ICC or similar outer loop around Indianapolis has been proposed to be designated as either I-269 or I-470.

SIU 3
From I-465 on the southwest side of Indianapolis, I-69 will follow the route of SR 37 south via Martinsville to Bloomington, at which point a new terrain routing to the southwest now serves NSWC Crane Division, Washington, and Oakland City. The route intersects I-64, at southern terminus of SIU 3. Beyond there, SIU 4 of I-69 continues south along the former I-164 freeway into Evansville, where a new toll bridge is planned to enter Kentucky and cross the Ohio River near the existing US 41 bridges (just north of which I-69 temporarily ends).

Tier 1 studies
INDOT has taken a two-tier approach to completing the environmental impacts documentation required for construction to proceed. During the Tier 1 studies, 14 route alternatives were analyzed and compared against the "No-Build" option. Of these alternatives, nine were eliminated from consideration as either having too great of an impact on the natural and human environment, failing to achieve the stated goals established for the I-69 extension, or both. The five alternatives that remained were as follows:

 Alternative 1 ran from US 41 to Terre Haute and along I-70 from Terre Haute to Indianapolis. This alternative was favored heavily by Terre Haute.
 Alternative 2 used US 41 to Vincennes and SR 67 from Vincennes to Indianapolis; it was favored by Princeton and Vincennes.
 Alternative 3 was one of the two mostly overland routes along SR 57, then cutting cross country on an alignment that roughly follows SR 45, to SR 37 near Bloomington and using SR 37 to Indianapolis. This proposal was largely supported by the Evansville area but opposed by a vocal minority in Bloomington. A modified version of Alternative 3 is the current path of I-69's construction.
 Alternative 4 followed SR 57 to US 231 near Bloomfield and US 231 from there to Spencer. Next, it went cross country to Martinsville and either followed SR 37 from Martinsville to Indianapolis or continued north to I-70 and used I-70 to Indianapolis. This concept had more support from the Hoosier Hills Area.
 Alternative 5 was the last studied and used SR 57 to US 50 bypass just south of Washington. Afterward, it followed US 50 eastward through Daviess and Martin counties to SR 37 just east of Bedford and then SR 37 from Bedford to Indianapolis. This alternative was favored mainly by Bedford.

In 2003, INDOT presented the Tier 1 environmental impact statement (EIS) to the FHWA, which identified Alternative 3C (following SR 37 between Indianapolis and Bloomington, then over new terrain to US 231 north of NSWC Crane Division, then following SR 57 south-southwest to the I-64/I-164 interchange northeast of Evansville) as the least environmentally damaging practical alternative. Subsequently, in March 2003, the FHWA issued a Record of Decision (ROD) approving the Tier 1 EIS for SIU 3.

In November 2005, then-Governor Mitch Daniels announced the Major Moves initiative, which would raise billions of dollars for transportation projects by leasing the Indiana Toll Road. Legislation enacted in March 2006 authorized Governor Daniels to lease the Indiana Toll Road to a joint-venture between Macquarie Infrastructure Group and Cintra for $3.8 billion (equivalent to $ in ). This came following new highway legislation by Congress in January 2006 that allocated over $58 million (equivalent to $ in ) to upgrade SR 37 to a full expressway from Indianapolis to Bloomington, regardless of what happened with I-69.

Nearly 15 years of environmental studies wrapped up on both the toll and free sections of the I-69 extension between Indianapolis and Evansville in 2006; the project was still being considered as a toll road by then. Project engineers and designers were by then identifying exact placement of interchanges, bridge structures, and connecting roads. In June 2006, officials revisited their decision from the Tier 1 EIS to account for the effects of tolling on the route, preparing a report that concluded that the previously selected route remained the preferred alternative, even with tolls; the report was approved by the FHWA in late 2006.

In October 2006, Democratic State Representatives David Crooks and Trent Van Haaften proposed revising Major Moves legislation to make the entire  length of I-69 between Evansville and Indianapolis part of SITR. Under their proposal, SITR would be operated by either INDOT, or a public authority to be established by future legislation. Additionally, the proposal called for SITR construction bonds to be paid off 30–40 years following the road's completion, at which point the tolls would be removed.

On November 9, 2006, Governor Daniels announced that I-69 between Evansville and Indianapolis would be built as a toll-free route, effectively canceling plans for SITR.

Tier 2 studies and lawsuits

Studies
During Tier 2 studies, INDOT further divided SIU 3 into six smaller segments, allowing work on each subsegment to proceed at its own pace. On December 21, 2006, INDOT announced completion of the Tier 2 draft EIS for the  section between I-64 and SR 64 near Oakland City. Officials further noted that they would accelerate the final EIS and construction on the southernmost  section from I-64 to SR 68 to facilitate access to the Toyota's Princeton plant. On April 30, Governor Daniels signed the state's two-year $26-billion (equivalent to $ in ) budget, which included $119 million (equivalent to $ in ) to fund construction of the southernmost segment of I-69, ensuring that construction would begin as scheduled in the summer of 2008. The final EIS for the southernmost section was issued on October 22, 2007.

On February 10, 2008, INDOT and the FHWA issued the Tier 2 draft EIS for two sections from Oakland City to Crane, totaling . Construction on two rural interchanges would be postponed to free up $30 million for the extended bridge. INDOT released the 5,000-page Tier 2 final EIS for Section 3 from US 50 in Washington to US 231 near Crane on December 10, 2009. The ROD for Section 3 was issued in March 2010 and construction began in April 2010. The ROD for Section 2 (Oakland City to Washington) was issued in May 2010. In May 2010, Governor Daniels announced plans for I-69 to be open from I-64 to Bloomington by 2014 (Sections 1 through 4).

Lawsuits
Opposition groups, including various community groups and local governments, cited environmental issues and the cost of extending I-69. Opponents of SITR protested the I-69 extension, including petition signing by more than 144,000 Hoosiers along the proposed I-69 corridor and mass mailings of opposition to Governor Daniels. Other acts of protest included the vandalizing of the Indiana Statehouse by protesters who spray-painted "I-69 is the enemy" and "No I-69" on the side of the limestone building. In 2005, activists opposed to the extension set fire to I-69 project offices near Bloomington. In 2007, a group performed a mock eviction of the I-69 project office in Oakland City.

There have been mixed opinions of the project. The routing was strongly opposed in Bloomington and Martinsville, while there was strong support in Evansville and Washington. The US Navy also supported the routing because it would provide access to NSWC Crane Division. The new route was also supported by the Teamsters Union, which represents many truck drivers, the American Trucking Associations, and several trade unions representing the construction industry. Residents of Bloomington and Martinsville both opposed upgrading SR 37 to I-69. The greatest support for I-69 was in Indiana's far southwestern counties and Evansville. Since the southwest corner is the only region not served by an Interstate Highway to Indianapolis, officials in southwest Indiana alleged that highway opponents are blocking I-69 construction in an attempt to further isolate the region from the remainder of the state. To the west, communities along US 41 favored the presently selected alignment in lieu of the only other feasible routing: I-70 to Terre Haute, then US 41 south to Evansville.

After the signing of Major Moves, highway opponents immediately filed two lawsuits to block the toll road lease legislation, arguing it violated the Constitution of Indiana. Among the arguments, the plaintiffs contested that funds generated from the sale of a state public works asset must go to the state's General Fund. In May 2006, St. Joseph County Superior Court Judge Michael Scopelitis issued a ruling declaring it a public suit (one that questions a public improvement) and, as such, required the plaintiffs to post a $1.9-billion (equivalent to $ in ) bond to continue the suit. In response, plaintiffs appealed the ruling to the Indiana Supreme Court, which upheld the lower court's ruling. With no means for the opposition to post the bond, Major Moves, and thus the proceeding of SITR, took effect with the closing of the deal on June 29, 2006.

On October 3, 2006, protest groups, citing environmental concerns, along with six individuals who live along the I-69 corridor, filed a lawsuit in federal court, alleging that state and federal agencies rigged environmental studies and violated several federal laws in the selection of a new-terrain route for I-69. They further pressed the court for a summary ruling directing the FHWA and INDOT to route I-69 over I-70 and US 41. Judge David Hamilton disagreed, and, on December 10, 2007, he issued a 58-page ruling upholding the selected route for I-69 and the Tier 1 ROD. His ruling did, however, leave open the possibility that the FHWA and INDOT could be forced to reconsider some or all of the previously rejected Tier 1 alternatives if there are new significant findings during the Tier 2 studies that were absent from the Tier 1 EIS. Barring any new major findings in the Tier 2 studies, Judge Hamilton's ruling paved the way for construction to begin on the southernmost segment.

Construction begins
On December 12, 2007, the FHWA issued its ROD giving final federal approval for construction to begin on the section between I-64/I-164 and SR 64 near Oakland City. INDOT awarded the first SIU 3 construction contract to Gohmann Asphalt and Construction Company of Sellersburg, Indiana, on February 6, 2008. This contract, completed on May 31, 2008, included the removal of buildings and vegetation from the I-69 right-of-way between I-64 and SR 68. Gohmann also won the construction contract for the first  from I-64 to SR 68 with a $25-million (equivalent to $ in ) bid. Construction began with a groundbreaking ceremony in Evansville on July 16, 2008. INDOT built this first section of the extension of I-69 using the design–build method.

The first open segment
On September 29, 2009, the first  of the I-69 extension opened when traffic was shifted from the short segment of SR 57 between I-64 and SR 68 to the portion of the new I-69 route mentioned above. There was some initial confusion as the shift and detour were unannounced and poorly signed initially. This resulted in numerous accidents when motorists either drove through the dead end on the old SR 57 or inadvertently ended up in opposing lanes of traffic on I-164 in the days following the I-69 opening. State troopers directed traffic through the new I-69 segment until crews could install additional signage to more clearly mark the new route. The former SR 57 roadway between SR 68 and I-64 was closed off with a cul-de-sac and now serves as a local access road.

Completion to Bloomington

The final link: Bloomington to Indianapolis

Section 5

Construction on Section 5 to upgrade SR 37 through Bloomington to Martinsville to Interstate standards at a cost of $425 million (equivalent to $ in ) was completed October 31, 2018. Under a public-private partnership, I-69 Development Partners was originally responsible for the section's construction. However, the partnership experienced multiple delays from the original completion date of October 2016 due to financial and other difficulties, including several work stoppages by subcontractors who cited a lack of being paid in the agreed to manner by the private group. On August 14, 2017, the State of Indiana terminated the P3 arrangement with I-69 Development Partners, citing default on the contract terms and construction being delayed two years from the initial October 2016 completion deadline. INDOT assumed direct oversight of Section 5 construction and contracted with Walsh Construction to serve as the prime contractor for the remainder of the project. Walsh oversaw several subcontractors retained from the I-69 Development Partners P3 arrangement that performed the earthworks, structure erection, paving, and other work to complete Section 5. As work wrapped up, the FHWA approved the designation of the highway as I-69 up to Martinsville on September 18, 2018, and signage was installed.

Section 6
The routing of Section 6 of I-69 from Martinsville to Indianapolis was again studied by INDOT, with five candidate finalist routes selected from nearly two-dozen options. On March 30, 2016, INDOT announced that I-69 would complete its route to Indianapolis following the current right-of-way of the SR 37 expressway. The Interstate will be constructed along the path of SR 37 from Martinsville—through Morgan, northwest Johnson, and southwest Marion counties—connecting with I-465. The only significant deviation from the present alignment of SR 37 would be just south of the junction at I-465, where the freeway will deviate slightly to the west to allow the present Harding Street interchange of I-465 to remain, with only slight modification to its western ramps. INDOT reported that studies have shown that this preferred routing would reduce crashes and congestion the most, affect less forest and farm acreage, and result in the greatest decrease in travel time. The SR 37 routing also reduces the cost of the project by eliminating the need for a bridge over the White River between Martinsville and I-465. The path also impacts the most businesses, which had been a concern raised by Martinsville residents, business owners, and lawmakers.

Unlike the P3 arrangement initially sought for Section 5, INDOT plans to complete Section 6 through traditional procurement methods, with five contracts let over several fiscal years. On February 8, 2018, a combined Tier 2 final EIS and ROD was published for Section 6. On September 4, 2018, $600 million (equivalent to $ in ) in funding for I-69 Section 6 was announced by Indiana Governor Eric Holcomb, with a goal of speeding up Section 6 completion to 2024. Construction of access roads and changes to local roads in the corridor began in Martinsville in 2019. Construction of the freeway itself began in Morgan and Johnson counties in 2020. Section 6 of I-69 is known as "I-69 Finish Line." INDOT closed SR 37 between Morgan Street and SR 39 in Martinsville starting on January 2, 2021, to enable the construction of I-69 through Martinsville to be completed in one construction season versus two seasons had SR 37 been kept open. This stretch was finally opened to traffic in stages in late December 2021. The northbound lanes were opened to traffic on December 20 following a ribbon-cutting ceremony with Governor Holcomb, and the southbound lanes were opened to traffic on December 23. The freeway will have two lanes in each direction in Morgan County, three in each direction from Smith Valley Road to Southport Road in Marion County, and four in each direction from Southport Road to I-465. The total cost of Section 6 is estimated to be $1.5 billion, which includes $700 to $800 million in actual construction costs, with an initial completion date of 2025. INDOT subsequently moved the planned completion date to 2024.

Financing construction
To fund construction of this extension, Indiana Governor Daniels introduced a proposal known as "Major Moves" in early 2006. It provided $700 million (equivalent to $ in ) from the Indiana Toll Road lease to be used to complete nearly 20 years of environmental studies and construct about half of the proposed extension (between the I-64/164 interchange and NSWC Crane Division). Due to ongoing controversy over making this portion of the extension a toll road, the governor announced in November 2006 that the entire stretch of the highway would be toll-free, subject to construction of the ICC (SIU 2). Officials with INDOT have since stated that I-69 will be toll-free regardless of whether or not the ICC is constructed. Additionally, the US Congress allocated an additional $14 million (equivalent to $ in ) in the 2005 SAFETEA-LU authorization to construct I-69 Evansville to Indianapolis.

The 2014–2015 Indiana State budget placed $400 million (equivalent to $ in ) in a "Major Moves 2020" fund, some of which will go towards completing I-69.

Designation extension
The ruling would allow INDOT to erect I-69 signs on portions of I-465 between the current interchange with I-69 in the northeast and the proposed interchange on the southwest, and reset reference posts (RP) and renumber exits and reference posts on the original section north of Indianapolis (starting with RP 200 instead of the then-current RP 0). The latter task was accomplished by the end of 2012.

SIU 4
This section of I-69 in Indiana incorporates the former I-164 south from I-64 into the Evansville metro area. Eventually, I-69 will deviate from the existing freeway to cross into the state of Kentucky on a new toll bridge over the Ohio River.

Signage was changed to I-69 beginning the week of November 17, 2014.

Interstate 69 Ohio River Crossing (I-69 ORX)

The original plan (in a draft EIS prepared by INDOT in 2004 but later dropped) was for I-69 to leave the now-former I-164 alignment somewhere just east of Green River Road (exit 3) and head south (instead of turning west with I-164) for approximately  before crossing the Ohio at a point near the mouth of the Green River. This portion of the route had not then been funded, as construction of the new Ohio River crossing and its approaches in both states was expected to cost approximately $800 million. Indiana and Kentucky officials had said construction on the new Ohio River Bridge would not begin until at least 2020, after two new crossings near Louisville were completed. With Indiana then preparing to break ground on SIU 3, Kentucky officials indicated that collecting tolls might be the only feasible option for completing the I-69 bridge, as traditional federal and state funding for such projects were drying up. , neither Kentucky nor Indiana officials had yet come up with the money to plan and construct this I-69 bridge.

In 2016, both states initiated a renewed push to build the bridge, and the present I-69 Ohio River Crossing (I-69 ORX) project was born. The process was broadened to study several alternative alignments for the river crossing and the possibility of making it a tolled facility was approved. , a new draft EIS was in the process of being prepared, a project website had been set up, public involvement and input were being solicited, and the preliminary routing alternatives had been narrowed to three. By June of that year, refinements had been made in all three proposed alternatives based on public input and additional engineering data. On December 14, 2018, the central corridor was chosen as the preferred route with an estimated cost of $1.5 billion for a new terrain bridge east of existing US 41.

Ground breaking on Section 1 of the ORX project was in June 2022. Section 1 focuses on the Kentucky approaches with improvements in Henderson and an extension of I-69 from KY 425 to US 60 of over  including new interchanges with US 41 and US 60 and a reconstructed KY 351 interchange. Section 2 is the bistate project between Indiana and Kentucky that will complete the I-69 connection from US 60 in Henderson to I-69 in Evansville, which includes the new river crossing. Design is expected to begin in 2025 with construction anticipated to begin in 2027 and continue through 2031. Section 3 is the bridge approach construction in Indiana. Design work and pre-construction activities are underway. INDOT is overseeing this section and construction is expected to begin in 2024 and end in 2027.

Controversies
The routing for SIU 3 of I-69 in Indiana was particularly controversial. The planned extension to Evansville pitted cities, towns, and counties against one another. The greatest support for an extended I-69 was in Indiana's far southwestern counties and Evansville, while the greatest opposition was between Indianapolis and Bloomington. Some in Bloomington and Martinsville opposed changing SR 37 to I-69, while still others welcomed this. The opposition led to Southwestern Indiana communities accusing highway opponents farther north of trying to isolate this region from the rest of the state by blocking construction of a direct highway link to Indianapolis. To the west, communities along US 41 favored the selected alignment in lieu of the only other feasible routing: I-70 to Terre Haute, then US 41 south to Evansville. Terre Haute preferred the I-70/US 41 routing over the selected routing of I-69 for local economic reasons. Despite the SR 37 routing ultimately being chosen, an Interstate-quality bypass was built east of Terre Haute (SR 641), to connect US 41 and I-70, bypassing the Honey Creek development.

INDOT, current and past governors, and businesses and elected officials in Evansville and adjacent southwest Indiana communities favored a direct route via Bloomington that would be built over new terrain from Bloomington to Evansville. Supporters argued that this direct route reduces the travel time to Indianapolis as well as improves access to Bloomington for residents of southwestern Indiana, something a route via Terre Haute would not achieve. INDOT officials also pointed out that SR 37 would eventually be upgraded from a four-lane expressway to full freeway status with or without I-69. After extensive review of the alternative routes as well as detailed environmental studies, the state selected the new terrain route via Bloomington.

The route selected, passes through the Patoka River National Wildlife Refuge but on a corridor that the federal government purposely did not acquire for the refuge. This was because of an agreement with the state not to dispute the passage of a highway on this corridor. Environmental groups then filed suit in federal court on October 2, 2006, to block further study and construction of the route, but the lawsuit was dismissed by US District Judge David F. Hamilton on December 12, 2007, clearing the way for construction to begin in 2008. Opponents had considered appealing Judge Hamilton's ruling to the US Court of Appeals for the Seventh Circuit (which could have possibly sent the case to the US Supreme Court), but they ultimately abandoned further legal challenges to the proposed route. Instead, opponents tried to block construction through the legislative process, when Democrats in the Indiana House of Representatives stripped funding for the I-69 extension in their version of the 2008 two-year state budget. Money for I-69 was restored after budget negotiations with the Republican-controlled Indiana Senate.

Another area of controversy arose in late 2005 when governor Mitch Daniels proposed levying tolls on the highway to finance its construction, either as a state project or a public–private partnership, in order to accelerate the project. As the route would overlay the existing SR 37 between Bloomington and Indianapolis, and there is no other free alternative route between Bloomington and Martinsville, this proposal has raised concerns among local residents and businesses. In March 2006, Daniels signed a bill known as "Major Moves" that leased the Indiana Toll Road but also included a compromise on constructing I-69 in southwest Indiana. On June 20, 2006, the Indiana Supreme Court rejected a legal challenge brought on by I-69 opponents, upholding Major Moves legislation in a 4–0 decision. The toll road option was highly unpopular, even among many who supported the extension via Bloomington. As a result, Governor Daniels announced in December 2006 that I-69 through southwest Indiana would be toll-free.

Protests

While Citizens for Appropriate Rural Roads had continued to rally crowds of opponents to appear at public hearings, other groups and individuals conducted acts of vandalism, ranging from spray-painting graffiti on the Indiana Statehouse in June 2005, to the breaking of windows of a private pro-I-69 business in Evansville in June 2008, to attempted arson at the I-69 regional planning office in Bloomington in July 2005. In the case of the Statehouse incident, two dozen protesters were arrested on charges ranging from disorderly conduct to an assault on a police officer. In addition to incidents in Indianapolis, numerous incidents have also occurred in and around the construction sites in Gibson County. Especially active has been a group called Roadblock Earth First which has been responsible for a number of incidents in Oakland City and at a Haubstadt asphalt yard given the contract for the first segment. In 2009, two protesters were arrested on charges of felony racketeering for disrupting public meetings in 2007 and 2008. These protests and acts of vandalism were viewed by some as an effort to intimidate proponents of I-69.

Exit list
Exit numbers on the new southern section of I-69 are a continuation of the old I-164 exit numbering. Starting on August 6, 2012, the state of Indiana began renumbering all exits and reference posts on the original route of I-69 from I-465 to the Michigan state line by adding 200 to each value; it was decided to add an even 200 despite the fact that the new extension is only  in order to minimize confusion.

Related routes

Auxiliary route
There is one auxiliary Interstate Highway for I-69 in Indiana, I-469, the beltway around the south, east, and north sides of Fort Wayne.

Indiana Commerce Connector
The Indiana Commerce Connector (ICC) was a proposed , Interstate-grade, partial outer beltway on the south and east sides of Indianapolis that was put forward by Governor Mitch Daniels in November 2006. The proposed road segment would have been numbered either I-269 or I-470 and connected four Interstate Highways at six locations. Proposed as a privately built toll road, it would have extended southward from Pendleton at I-69, through Greenfield at I-70, Shelbyville at I-74, Franklin at I-65, Martinsville at I-69, to a southern terminus at I-70 near Mooresville. On March 24, 2007, Governor Daniels withdrew the proposal for the ICC due to lack of public support. It has been suggested that the ICC be signed as either I-269 or I-470.

In April 2014, the logistics group Connexus Indiana and others came out in favor of reactivating the proposal for the ICC. However, the Indy Chamber (formerly the Indianapolis Chamber of Commerce) is among those who have stated opposition to the plan.

See also

Notes

References

External links

 INDOT I-69 Evansville to Indianapolis project
 Indiana Highway Ends: Interstate 69
 Central Indiana Suburban Transportation and Mobility Study (CISTMS) web page.

 Indiana
69
Transportation in Vanderburgh County, Indiana
Transportation in Warrick County, Indiana
Transportation in Gibson County, Indiana
Transportation in Pike County, Indiana
Transportation in Daviess County, Indiana
Transportation in Greene County, Indiana
Transportation in Monroe County, Indiana
Transportation in Morgan County, Indiana

Transportation in Marion County, Indiana
Transportation in Hamilton County, Indiana
Transportation in Madison County, Indiana
Transportation in Delaware County, Indiana
Transportation in Grant County, Indiana
Transportation in Huntington County, Indiana
Transportation in Allen County, Indiana
Transportation in DeKalb County, Indiana
Transportation in Steuben County, Indiana